Claudio López may refer to:
Claudio López (mayor) (1767-1833), pre-statehood Alcade-Mayor of Los Angeles
Claudio López Bru (1853–1925), Catalan businessman and philanthropist
Claudio López (footballer) (born 1974), Argentine footballer